Sexual anorexia is a term coined in 1975 by psychologist Nathan Hare to describe a fear of or deep aversion to sexual activity. It is a pathological loss of "appetite" for romantic-sexual interaction, often the result of a fear of intimacy to the point that the person has severe anxiety surrounding sexual activity and emotional aspects (i.e. an intimate relationship). The term largely exists in a colloquial sense and is not presently classified as a disorder in the Diagnostic Statistical Manual.

In comparing sexual anorexia to anorexia nervosa, some psychologists suggest that the two disorders share four main characteristics: Control, fear, anger, and justification.

Empirical data 
Very few studies have been conducted to investigate the specific diagnostic patterns or criteria regarding sexual anorexia. However, one study conducted by Dr. Patrick Carnes found that many of his patients diagnosed with sexual anorexia also had a history of sexual, physical, or emotional abuse, other compulsive or addictive problems such as substance abuse, or a family history of addiction. However, only early treatment data was used, and sample size was very limited.

Sexual addiction
In the view of some practitioners, corroborating the work of Patrick Carnes, there are people who appear to have a sexual addiction which is expressed through a variety of behaviors such as the compulsive use of strip clubs, prostitutes, porn sites, etc. but fit the definition of sexual anorexic in that they seem to lack the ability to have a relationship of a sexual nature beyond a paid-for or anonymous experience. Nonetheless, the data for sex addicts and sexual anorexics draw many similarities in terms of family, abuse, and medical history.

Social Phobia 
Symptoms of Sexual Anorexia have also been linked to social anxiety and social phobias. Crossover between the two disorders consists of a deep fear of relationship and/or interactions with others, which for a socially anxious individual might manifest in a complete avoidance of all social interaction, including sexual interaction. Sexual anorexics may experience similar symptoms that are perhaps isolated to their sexual interactions, or the two conditions may be co-morbid.

History of the term 
The concept of sexual anorexia was first mentioned by psychologist Nathan Hare in his 1975 dissertation at the California School of Professional Psychology. Ellen Goodman, the nationally syndicated columnist, wrote about psychiatrist Sylvia Kaplan's use of the concept in 1981 and this was noted in the editor's "Notes" in the journal Black Male/Female Relationships. Nathan and Julia Hare's "Sexual Anorexia" in Crisis in Black Sexual Politics was published in 1989.

The term was widely popularized in psychologist Patrick Carnes' book Sexual Anorexia: Overcoming Sexual Self-Hatred, published in 1997. More recently, Julia Hare has used it in the book The Sexual and Political Anorexia of the Black Woman in June 2008.

Causes
There are many potential factors which can result in an avoidance of sexual intimacy. Physical complications resulting from exhaustion, hormone imbalances, and medication use as well as emotional complications resulting from sexual abuse or power imbalances between partners can cause sexual anorexia. Among the most well-documented and perhaps severe cases are those linked to sexual assault (especially assault which occurs in childhood) and unhealthy body images.

Treatment
A sex addict is more likely to be capable of being in a more intimate relationship and is often married or in a committed relationship when deciding to get treatment for their addiction. A sexual anorexic may have a social phobia or be so fragile emotionally that the risk of rejection or criticism is far more frightening than being isolated. A link to narcissism, sexual anorexia, and sexual addiction has been discussed by researchers who propose that the two disorders share an inflated sense of self. Sexual anorectics may find themselves more prone to social anxiety and fear of intimacy than others who possess narcissistic tendencies, and may also present with a more fragile sense of self-worth than the sexual addict.

Treatment is aimed at helping the person see where their fears lie and to see the world in less black and white terms. The patient is encouraged to take calculated risks with social activities and distorted thinking is gently challenged with facts and reality. The goals for both sex addicts and sexual anorexics is to learn to have healthy sex and get emotional needs met in direct ways, and to set healthy boundaries. This is an issue that requires ongoing treatment in planned stages with the end goal of autonomy, independence, and improved social relationships.

See also 
 Hypoactive sexual desire disorder
Sexual dysfunction

References

Further reading

External links
 Sexual Anorexia

Human sexuality
Sexual disorders